Archdeacon Habib Qozman Mankarious Girgis (Habib Girgis :  for "Beloved" George ; 1876 – 21 August 1951) was a modern-day dean of the Catechetical School of Alexandria.

He was the very first student for the modern-day Theological School, and was thus appointed to succeed his predecessor, Youssef Bey Mankarious, in the year 1918, as the second dean of the renewed center of theology.

On 20 June 2013, he was canonised as a saint by the Holy Synod of the Coptic Orthodox Church.

Early work

Before he became the head of renowned Theological Seminary, Habib Girgis felt that preaching and adult education were not sufficient for the advancement of the Coptic Orthodox Church. Protestant and Catholic missionaries have been at work since the mid-nineteenth century, with the aim to radically influence the views of the Copts in order to abandon their long lasting faith in Oriental Orthodoxy. Thus, with many issues at hand, Habib Girgis decided to establish Sunday schools at the beginning of the twentieth century as a means of satisfying the need for education. As a result, Coptic Orthodox Sunday schools were founded in major cities in Egypt in the year 1900—fifteen years before there were even Egyptian public schools. The Sunday school movement flourished in Egypt after much hard work, and now, Coptic studies thrive in Egypt and abroad.

As Habib Girgis saw it, the interest of young children were the true foundations of Sunday schools, and by 1900, Sunday school was the main pillar for the renaissance of Coptic Orthodox Christianity in the twentieth century until present, thanks in part to the hard work of Habib Girgis and other famous modern-day Sunday school teachers in the Coptic Church. Coptic churches and villages throughout Egypt at the start of the twentieth century felt that they needed to include better curriculum and more textbooks. By the year 1899, Pope Cyril V issued the need to teach children to learn and deepen their faith, as Habib Girgis visualized the need for raising children in accordance with the teachings of Christianity and the spirit of faithful patriotism.

Habib Girgis worked to restructure Sunday school curricula significantly, as he had striven to do what he did eventually: to improve academic standards.

Dean of the Seminary
He dedicated his life to the seminary and its improvement. Habib Girgis assisted the Pope in expanding its buildings in Mahmasha. Pope Kyrillos V often visited the seminary and blessed its students. This deacon was a skillful speaker. He accompanied the Pope in his pastoral visits to Upper Egypt and Sudan. He translated many religious books from foreign languages to Arabic and published El-Karma periodical, to spread the facts of the faith in a positive way. He published many books, among them were: The Seven Sacraments of the Church, The Consoler of the Faithful, The Mystery of Piety, and many others. He taught and nurtured many generations of clergymen who flourished in the church and filled it with their sermons and religious publications.

His term as dean ended with his death in 1951. However, Pope Yusab II appointed Father Ibrahim Attia later that year.

With Father Ibrahim, who did carry the work on, there were many new improvements in the years to come. This would eventually lead up to Bishop (the recently departed Pope) Shenouda's involvement as the current dean of the Catechetical School of Alexandria.

Sainthood
On 20 June 2013, Announcement of the Holy Synod of the Coptic Orthodox Church, presided over by Pope Tawadros II, by the sanctity of Habib Girgis.

Biography
A Biography called "Habib Girgis, Coptic orthodox Educator and A light in the Darkness" by Bishop Anba Suriel was published by SVS Press in 2017 and includes newly discovered texts from the Coptic Orthodox Archives in Cairo.

See also
Catechetical School of Alexandria
Institute of Coptic Studies
List of prominent Copts
Mikhail Girgis El Batanouny
Pope Shenouda III

References

External links
The Theological School of Alexandria by Father Mathew Attia
The story and significance of Archdiacon Habib Girgis (Arabic)
The story and significance of Archdeacon George Habib (automatic translation)

Egyptian people of Coptic descent
Coptic Orthodox Christians from Egypt
Coptic Orthodox saints
Deans of the Catechetical School of Alexandria
1951 deaths
1876 births